Citipointe may refer to:

Citipointe Christian College, a school in Brisbane, Australia
Citipointe Church, Brisbane, Australia

See also
Christian Outreach College (disambiguation), the former name of several schools, including Citipointe
City Point (disambiguation)